Neyesaneh (also Romanized as Neyesāneh; also known as Neyestāneh) is a village in Sirvan Rural District, Nowsud District, Paveh County, Kermanshah Province, Iran. At the 2006 census, its population was 229, in 56 families.

References 

Populated places in Paveh County